Magnificent may refer to:
HMS Magnificent, Royal Navy ships
HMCS Magnificent (CVL 21), a Canadian ship
Magnificent!, a 1969 album by jazz pianist Barry Harris
"Magnificent" (Rick Ross song)
"Magnificent" (U2 song)
"Magnificent", a song by Estelle from Shine

See also
The Magnificents (disambiguation)
List of people known as the Magnificent
The Magnificent (disambiguation)
Magnificence (disambiguation)